This list of fossil fish research presented in 2023 is a list of new taxa of jawless vertebrates, placoderms, acanthodians, fossil cartilaginous fishes, bony fishes, and other fishes that were described during the year, as well as other significant discoveries and events related to paleoichthyology that occurred in 2023.

Jawless vertebrates

Jawless vertebrate research

Placoderms

Placoderm research
 Brazeau et al. (2023) describe a near-complete "acanthothoracid" upper jaw from the Devonian (Pragian) Yamaat Gol locality (Mongolia), and interpret this finding as indicating that the morphology and function of "acanthoracid" jaws resemble generalized "placoderm" conditions seen also in arthrodires and rhenanids.
 Engelman (2023) attempts to determine body size of Dunkleosteus terrelli, recovering the body lengths of between 3.1 and 3.5 m for typical adults and ~4.1 m for the largest individuals.

Acanthodians

Acanthodian research

Cartilaginous fishes

Cartilaginous fish research
 Fossil material of members of the genera Pucapampella and Zamponiopteron is described from the Devonian (Eifelian) Chagrapi Formation by Zevallos-Valdivia et al. (2023), representing the first record of Paleozoic vertebrates from Peru reported to date.
 A study on the musculoskeletal anatomy of Iniopera is published by Dearden, Herrel & Pradel (2023), who interpret the anatomy of Iniopera as unsuited to durophagy, and consider it to be likely a high-performance suction-feeder.
 Fossil material of members of at least seven species belonging to the genus Ptychodus is described from the ?Cenomanian–Santonian of the Malyy Prolom area (Ryazan Oblast, Russia) by Amadori et al. (2023), who also report the northernmost occurrence of Ptychodus in Europe from the Cenomanian of Varavinsky ravine area (Moscow Oblast, Russia), and interpret the studied fossils as indicating that Late Cretaceous epicontinental seas of the Russian platform were important areas of diversification and spread of Ptychodus.
 A study on the teeth of Megachasma applegatei is published by Krak & Shimada (2023), who find that the range of the morphometric variation of teeth of M. applegatei is larger than that of teeth of extant megamouth shark, with different tooth types corresponding to tooth types present in the smalltooth sand tiger.
 A study on the anatomy and affinities of Protospinax annectans, based on data from both known and previously undescribed specimens from the Tithonian Altmühltal Formation (Germany), is published by Jambura et al. (2023).
 Ferrón (2023) argues that, although representatives of most squalomorph groups colonized deep waters independently during the Late Jurassic and Early Cretaceous, bioluminescence evolved only once among sharks in a bathydemersal ancestor.
 A fossil egg case containing a well-preserved batoid (possibly stem-myliobatiform) embryo, with a unique combination of characters indicating that the embryo represents a previously unknown batoid form, is described from the Cenomanian Sannine limestone of Hjoula (Lebanon) by Capasso & Yamaguchi (2023).
 Reinecke et al. (2023) study the anatomy and affinities of whiptail stingray teeth from the Chattian of northern Germany and the Burdigalian of southern France, transferring the species Dasyatis probsti to the genus Bathytoshia.
 A study on changes of diversity of European chondrichthyans during the Neogene is published by Villafaña et al. (2023).
 A study on the impact of the Cretaceous–Paleogene extinction event on elasmobranchs is published by Guinot & Condamine (2023), who find rays and durophagous species to be more affected by the extinction than sharks and nondurophagous species, and find taxa with large geographic ranges or restricted to high-latitude settings to show higher survival.

Ray-finned fishes

Ray-finned fish research
 Figueroa et al. (2023) report brain and cranial nerve soft-tissue preservation in the type specimen of Coccocephalus wildi from the Carboniferous strata in the Mountain Fourfoot Mine (Pennine Lower Coal Measures; Lancashire, United Kingdom).
 New information on the morphology of the scales of members of the family Pseudobeaconiidae, based on new fossil material from the Triassic Santa Clara Abajo Formation (Argentina), is presented by Giordano, Benavente & Suárez (2023).
 Systematic revision of the Late Jurassic species of Caturidae is published by López-Arbarello & Ebert (2023).
 A study on the bone histology of Araripichthys castilhoi, interpreted as corroborating its placement within basal Teleostei, is published by Mayrinck et al. (2023).
 Stinnesbeck et al. (2023) report the presence of two different body shape types of specimens of Tselfatia formosa from the Turonian platy limestone deposit of Vallecillo (Mexico), intepreted as evidence of sexual dimorphism, and interpret the anatomy of its fins as indicating that T. formosa lived in a deep water environment and that its lifestyle resembled that of extant fan fishes.
 Redescription and a study on the affinities of Sorbinichthys elusivo is published by Taverne & Capasso (2023).
 Evidence from (mostly lanternfish) otoliths from the Lindos Bay Formation (Rhodes, Greece), interpreted as indicative of an overall decline of the median size of lanternfishes in the eastern Mediterranean during MIS 19 interglacial, but also as indicative of different trends in size in individual mesopelagic species across the studied time interval, is presented by Agiadi et al. (2023).

Lobe-finned fishes

Lobe-finned fish research

References 

2023 in paleontology